Mandie Claire Godliman (born 5 April 1973) is an English former cricketer. She made one Test and 11 One Day International appearances for England between 2002 and 2003. She played domestic cricket for Thames Valley, Sussex, Wellington, Canterbury and Northern Districts.

References

External links
 

1973 births
Living people
England women Test cricketers
England women One Day International cricketers
Sussex women cricketers
Wellington Blaze cricketers
Canterbury Magicians cricketers
Northern Districts women cricketers
Wicket-keepers